Mission Elapsed Time (MET) is used by NASA during their space missions, most notably during their Space Shuttle missions. Because so much of the mission depends on the time of launch, all events after launch are scheduled on the Mission Elapsed Time. This avoids constant rescheduling of events in case the launchtime slips. The MET-clock is set to zero at the moment of liftoff and counts forward in normal days, hours, minutes, and seconds. For example, 2:03:45:18 MET means it has been 2 days, 3 hours, 45 minutes, and 18 seconds since liftoff. MET was formerly called Ground Elapsed Time (GET) prior to the Space Shuttle.

The International Space Station (ISS) does not use an MET clock since it is a "permanent" and international mission. The ISS observes Greenwich Mean Time (UTC/GMT). When the shuttle visited ISS the ISS-crew usually adjusted their workday to the MET clock to make work together easier. The shuttles also had UTC clocks so that the astronauts could easily figure out what the "official" time aboard ISS was.

In 2019, a test flight of the Boeing CST-100 Starliner spacecraft suffered a mission anomaly through an incorrectly set Mission Elapsed Time on the vehicle.

References

Spaceflight
Time scales